Misadventures in Babysitting

 "Misadventures in Babysitting" (The Adventures of Super Mario Bros. 3), episode
 "Misadventures in Babysitting" (Full House episode)
 "Misadventures in Babysitting", the eighth episode of season 1 of Lizzie McGuire

See also
 Adventures in Babysitting a 1987 American comedy film
 Adventures in Babysitting (2016 film), a television film remake